Assadourian is a surname. Notable people with the surname include:

Éric Assadourian (born 1966), Armenian footballer
Sarkis Assadourian (born 1948), Armenian-Canadian politician
Sarkis Assadourian (born 1948), Armenian fencer